Chiayi Municipal Baseball Stadium is a multi-use stadium in Chiayi City, Taiwan. It is currently used for baseball games and was the home field for the Chinatrust Whales from 1998 to 2003. The stadium was originally built in 1918 during the Taiwan under Japanese rule era and has been repeatedly refurbished. After the last refurbishment (1998) the stadium can host 10,000 spectators, and regularly hosts Chinese Professional Baseball League (CPBL) games.

Trivia
This stadium is not the Chiayi County Baseball Stadium located in Taibao City, Chiayi County. The Chiayi County Baseball Stadium was built in 1996 and had been substantially invested and maintained by the Taiwan Major League as the home stadium of the Chiayi-Tainan Luka. On the contrary, Chiayi Baseball Field has been mainly for the use of CPBL. Chiayi County Baseball Stadium has a smaller capacity and is currently derelict after TML's collapse in 2003.

See also
 List of stadiums in Taiwan
 Sport in Taiwan

References

1918 establishments in Taiwan
Baseball venues in Taiwan
Buildings and structures in Chiayi
Sports venues completed in 1918